The 2008–09 Druga HNL (also known as 2. HNL) season was the 18th season of Croatia's second level football since its establishment in 1992. Croatia Sesvete were league champions and were promoted to Prva HNL at the end of the previous season.

The league featured 16 clubs, playing in a double round robin league system. The season started on 23 August 2008 and ended on 30 May 2009.

Changes from last season
The following clubs have been promoted or relegated at the end of the 2007–08 season:

From 2. HNL
Promoted to 1. HNL
 Croatia Sesvete (winners of 2007–08 Druga HNL)

Relegated to 3. HNL
 Marsonia (13th place)
 Kamen Ingrad (14th place)
 Vukovar '91 (15th place)
 Belišće (16th place)

To 2. HNL
Relegated from 1. HNL
 Međimurje (12th place)

Promoted from 3. HNL
 Suhopolje (3. HNL East winners) 
 Junak Sinj (3. HNL South third place)1
 Karlovac (3. HNL West winners)
 Lokomotiva (3. HNL West runners-up)2

Notes
1 Hrvace had won the 3. HNL South but didn't obtain a license for competing in Druga HNL, while second-placed team Zagora didn't even requested one. Because of this, third-placed Junak Sinj qualified automatically for promotion.
2 Lokomotiva, as the 3. HNL West runners-up, qualified for the two-legged promotion playoff, which would have taken place between second-placed teams of 3. HNL East and West Division. As the 3. HNL East runners-up Grafičar Vodovod didn't get the license for Druga HNL, third-placed Virovitica qualified for the playoff. However, their board of directors decided to withdraw five days before the first match. Because of this, Lokomotiva were automatically promoted to Druga HNL.

In a two-legged promotion/relegation playoff between Inter Zaprešić (as 11th placed 1. HNL team) and Hrvatski Dragovoljac (as 2. HNL runners-up), the former kept their Prva HNL status by beating Hrvatski Dragovoljac with 2–0 on aggregate (2–0, 0–0).

Clubs

League table

Results

Top goalscorers
The top scorers in the 2008–09 Druga HNL season were:

See also 
2008–09 Prva HNL
2008–09 Croatian Cup

References

External links
League's official website 

First Football League (Croatia) seasons
Drug
Cro